Vaasa (Sweden ), in the years 1855–1917 as Nikolainkaupunki (literally meaning "city of Nicholas), is a city on the west coast of Finland. It received its charter in 1606, during the reign of Charles IX of Sweden and is named after the Royal House of Vasa. Vaasa is also well known as a major university and college city in Finland.

The surrounding Ostrobothnian municipalities (such as Korsholm and Malax) have a clear Swedish-speaking majority, which is why the Swedish language maintains a strong position in the city, making it the most significant cultural center for Swedish-Finns.

Vaasa is also known for Tropiclandia Water Park, which is located in the Vaskiluoto Island right next to a local spa hotel. In the immediate vicinity of Tropiclandia was the now deserted Wasalandia Amusement Park, which ceased operations in 2015 due to a small number of visitors.

History

Name
Over the years, Vaasa has changed its name several times, due to alternative spellings, political decisions and language condition changes. At first it was called  or  after the village where it was founded in 1606, but just a few years later the name was changed to Vasa to honor the royal Swedish lineage. Mustasaari (Finnish) or Korsholm (Swedish) remains as the name of the surrounding mostly rural municipality, which since 1973 surrounds the city.

Foundation 

The history of Korsholm and also of Vaasa begins in the 14th century, when seafarers from the coastal region in central Sweden disembarked at the present Old Vaasa, and the wasteland owners from Southwest Finland came to guard their land.

In the middle of the century, Saint Mary's Church was built, and in the 1370s the building of the fortress at Korsholm, Crysseborgh, was undertaken, and served as an administrative centre of the Vasa County. In 1611, the town was chartered and renamed after the Royal House of Vasa.

Thanks to the sea connections, ship building and trade, especially tar trade, Vaasa flourished in the 17th century and most of the inhabitants earned their living from it.

In 1683, the three-subject or Trivial school moved from Nykarleby to Vaasa, and four years later a new schoolhouse was built in Vaasa. The first library in Finland was founded in Vaasa in 1794. In 1793, Vaasa had 2,178 inhabitants, and in the year of the catastrophic town fire of 1852 the number had risen to 3,200.

Finnish War 
During the Finnish War, fought between Sweden and Russia in 1808–1809, Vaasa suffered more than any other city. In June 1808, Vaasa was occupied by the Russian forces, and some of the local officials pledged allegiance to the occupying force.

On 25 June 1808 the Swedish colonel Johan Bergenstråhle was sent with 1,500 troops and four cannons to free Vaasa from the 1,700 Russian troops who were led by generalmajor Nikolay Demidov. The Battle of Vaasa started with the Swedish force disembarking north of Vaasa in Österhankmo and advancing all the way to the city where they attacked with 1,100 troops, as some had to be left behind to secure the flank. There was heavy fighting in the streets and in the end the Swedish forces were repelled and forced to retreat back the way they came.

Generalmajor Demidov suspected that the inhabitants of Vaasa had taken to arms and helped the Swedish forces, even though the provincial governor had confiscated all weapons that spring, and he took revenge by letting his men plunder the city for several days. During those days 17 civilians were killed, property was looted and destroyed, many were assaulted and several people were taken to the village of Salmi in Kuortane where they had to endure the physical punishment called running the gauntlet. The massacre in Vaasa was exceptional during the Finnish war as the Russian forces had avoided that kind of cruelty that far. It was probably a result of the frustration the Russians felt because of intensive guerilla activity against them in the region.

On 30 June the Russian forces withdrew from Vaasa, and all officials that had pledged allegiance to Russia were discharged, and some were assaulted by locals. On 13 September the Russian forces returned and on the next day the decisive Battle of Oravais, which was won by Russia, was fought some  further north. By winter 1808, the Russian forces had overrun all of Finland, and in the Treaty of Fredrikshamn (17 September 1809) Sweden lost the whole eastern part of its realm. Vaasa would now become a part of the newly formed Grand Duchy of Finland within the Russian Empire.

Town fire 

The mainly wooden and densely built town was almost utterly destroyed in 1852. A fire started in a barn belonging to district court judge J. F. Aurén on the morning of 3 August. At noon the whole town was ablaze and the fire lasted for many hours. By evening, most of the town had burned to the ground. Out of 379 buildings only 24 privately owned buildings had survived, among them the Falander–Wasastjerna patrician house (built in 1780–1781) which now houses the Old Vaasa Museum.

The Court of Appeal (built in 1775, nowadays the Church of Korsholm), some Russian guard-houses along with a gunpowder storage and the buildings of the Vaasa provincial hospital (nowadays a psychiatric hospital) also survived the blaze. The ruins of the greystone church, the belfry, the town hall and the trivial school can still be found in their original places. Much of the archived material concerning Vaasa and its inhabitants was destroyed in the fire. According to popular belief, the fire got started when a careless visitor from Vörå fell asleep in Aurén's barn and dropped his pipe in the dry hay.

New town 
The town's coastal location offered good conditions for seafaring. The town plan was planned by Carl Axel Setterberg in the Empire style. In the master plan the disastrous consequences of the fire were considered. Main streets in the new town were five broad avenues which divided the town into sections. Each block was divided by alleys.

The town was promptly renamed Vasa (Vaasa) after the Tsar Nicholas II was overthrown in 1917.

Capital of Finland 

During the Finnish Civil War, Vaasa was the capital of Finland from 29 January to 3 May 1918. As a consequence of the occupation of central places and arresting of politicians in Helsinki the Senate decided to move the senators to Vaasa, where the White Guards that supported the Senate had a strong position and the contacts to the West were good.

The Senate of Finland began its work in Vaasa on 1 February 1918, and it had four members. The Senate held its sessions in the Town Hall. To express its gratitude to the town the Senate gave Vaasa the right to add the Cross of Freedom, independent Finland's oldest mark of honour designed by Akseli Gallen-Kallela, to its coat of arms, to the town's coat of arms. The coat of arms is unusual not only in this respect, but also because of its non-standard shape and a crown are included. Because of its role in the civil war, Vaasa became known as "The White City". A Statue of Freedom, depicting a victorious White soldier, was erected in the town square.

Post-war 

The language conditions in the city shifted in the 1930s, and the majority became Finnish-speaking. Therefore, the primary name also changed from "Vasa" to "Vaasa", according to Finnish spelling.

Post-war, Vaasa was industrialized, led by the electronics manufacturer Strömberg, later merged into ABB.

In 2013 the municipality of Vähäkyrö was merged into Vaasa. It is currently an exclave area of the city, since it is surrounded by other municipalities.

Climate 
Near the Polar Circle, Vaasa falls in continental subarctic climate (Köppen: Dfc) with severe dry winters and almost warm summers. The prevailing direction of the winds, North Atlantic Current and the proximity of the Gulf of Bothnia give the climate a certainly livability in spite of the latitude, similar to the south of Alaska, where continentality, proximity to the poles and moderation intersect. The Föhn wind, for example, passes over the Scandinavian Mountains and leaves a milder and drier weather in the lee of the mountains where Vaasa is found, affecting especially in the winter which explains sunny days even in the season of short solar duration.

The location of some sea distance gives a seasonal delay of spring and summer at the same time that autumn and winter are affected late. The average annual temperature is 4.7 °C (normal from 1991 to 2020). The low Ostrobothnia usually receives little snow but the contact of cold air with warmer and humid air can generate heavy snowfall. Early summer (as well as spring) tends to be drier and the wettest month does not coincide with the warmer month. End of April is usually the growing season with 250–300 mm approximately.  The maritime breeze explains the difference in temperature, distribution of precipitation and sunshine, different from the Gulf of Finland, the Gulf of Bothnia brings the sea wind in places further distant about 50 km from the coast. The city gets more sun than inland places, although current log are unavailable. The highest ever recorded temperature was 32.2 °C (89.6 °F),  on 18 July 2018, although a record of 33.7 °C (92.7 °F) was recorded in the city center the same day, which in fact was the hottest day of Finland in 2018 by slightly edging a temperature recorded in Turku Artukainen of 33.6 °C (92.5 °F), also on 18 July 2018, making it the highest temperature ever recorded in Vaasa.

Demographics

Economy 

Vaasa is generally speaking an industrial town, with several industrial parks. Industry comprises one-fourth of jobs.

There is a university (University of Vaasa), faculties of Åbo Akademi and Hanken, and two universities of applied sciences in the town. Many workers commute from Korsholm, Laihia, and other municipalities nearby.

The Vaskiluoto power stations complex is situated on the island of Vaskiluoto, supplying electricity to the national grid as well as district heat to the city.

The multi-use cargo and passenger Port of Vaasa is located in Vaskiluoto, connecting Vaasa with Umeå, Sweden, and destinations further afield.

The film production company Future Film has its head office in Vaasa. Kotipizza has its head office in the Vaskiluodon Satamaterminaali.

Transport 

Main roads, including highway 3 (E12) and highway 8 (E8), connect Vaasa to Helsinki, Tampere, Oulu, Pori, Jyväskylä, Kokkola and Seinäjoki. It is also a relatively short distance from Sweden to Vaasa. The tourist route called Blue Highway also runs from the port of Vaasa and through the city. In 1962–1964, other Finnish cities introduced regional speed limits of 50 km/h, but in Vaasa the limit was 60 km/h for a long time.

Vaasa Airport is located about nine kilometers southeast of the city center. Finnair and Scandinavian Airlines operate from Vaasa Airport, but Norwegian Air Shuttle terminated the Vaasa–Helsinki route on 10 January 2020. There is scheduled traffic from Vaasa Airport to Helsinki (flight time 45 min) and Stockholm (flight time 1 h 5 min).

Culture
 Ostrobothnian Museum
 Terranova Museum
 Meteoriihi
 Kuntsi Museum of Modern Art
 Vaasa Car & Motor Museum
 Platform, artist run gallery for contemporary art, media art, & sound art

Other sights
 The Statue of Liberty (Suomen Vapaudenpatsas)

Sport
 Vaasan Sport, men's ice hockey team playing in the Liiga, home ice is Vaasan Sähkö Areena
 Mailattaret, Vaasa, a women's Finnish baseball team playing in the Superpesis.
 Vaasan Sport Naiset, women's ice hockey team playing in the Naisten Liiga, home ice is Vaasan Sähkö Areena
 Vaasan Palloseura, men's football club playing in the Ykkönen, home ground is Hietalahti Stadium
 Vasa IFK, men's football club playing in the Kakkonen, home ground is Hietalahti Stadium
 FC Kiisto, men's football club playing in the Kolmonen, home ground is Kaarlen kenttä
 Vaasa Rugby Club
Vaasa Wolves, inactive men's rugby union team, played in the Finnish Championship Rugby League until 2019 
Vaasa Foxes, women's rugby sevens team playing in the Finnish Championship 7's Series

Education 

Vaasa has three universities. The largest one is the University of Vaasa, which is located in the neighbourhood of Palosaari. Palosaari is a peninsula near the center of Vaasa, connected to it by bridges. The other two universities are Åbo Akademi, headquartered in Turku, and the Hanken School of Economics headquartered in Helsinki. Unique to Vaasa is the Finland-Swedish teachers training school Vasa övningsskola, part of Åbo Akademi. The University of Helsinki also has a small unit, specialized in law studies, in the city centre.

The city has two universities of applied sciences: Vaasa University of Applied Sciences (former Vaasa Polytechnic), located right next to the University of Vaasa, and Novia University of Applied Sciences (former Swedish University of Applied Sciences).

City has about 13,000 university students and about 4,000 vocational school students.

Notable people

 Fanny Churberg (1845–1892) – Painter
 Sebastian Da Costa – Musician
 Seppo Evwaraye – Professional American football player
 Rabbe Grönblom – Businessman
 Kai Hahto - Metal Drummer/drum teacher
 Nanny Hammarström (1870–1953) – Author
 Jarl Hemmer – Author
 Edvin Hevonkoski – Sculptor
 Mikaela Ingberg – Javelin thrower
 Fritz Jakobsson – Painter
 Vesa 'Vesku' Jokinen – Musician, the lead singer of Klamydia
 Mikael Jungner – MD of Yleisradio
 Samuli Kivimäki - professional ice hockey player
 Heli Koivula-Kruger – Athlete
 Susanna 'Suski' Korvala – Singer
 Björn Kurtén – Paleontologist, author
 Joachim Kurtén – Businessman, politician
 Toivo Kuula – Composer
 August Alexander Levón – Industrialist, businessman
 Jani Liimatainen – Guitar player
 Nandor Mikola – Painter
 Camilla Nylund – Opera singer
 Jorma Ojaharju – Author
 Oskar Osala – Ice hockey player
 Sari Krooks – Ice hockey player
 Pekka Puska – Doctor, expert on public health, politician
 Viljo Revell – Architect, works included Toronto City Hall in Canada.
 Seppo Sanaksenaho – Mayor of Vaasa 1997–2001, Deputy Mayor 1979–1996
 Leif Segerstam – Musician, composer, conductor
 Monica Aspelund – Singer
 Carl Axel Setterberg – Architect, creator of the new Vaasa
 Pekka Strang – Actor
 Jani Toivola – Member of parliament, actor, television host (Finnish Idols 2007, The Voice TV)
 Onni Tommila – Actor (Big Game, Rare Exports: A Christmas Tale)
 Allu Tuppurainen – Actor, creator of Rölli
 Jenny Wilhelms – Musician
 Carl Gustaf Wolff – Businessman
 Mathilda Wrede – "Friend of the inmates"
 Yrjö Sakari Yrjö-Koskinen (Georg Zacharias Forsman) – Politician, professor, fennoman
 Daco Junior – Finnish singer and rapper
 Håkan Nyblom – Finnish wrestler
 Miika Koivisto – Ice hockey player
 Jukka Seppo - Ice hockey player
 Lauri Tähkä - Singer/songwriter
 Vappu Taipale - Psychiatrist and politician
 Juha Tapio - Singer, lyricist, composer and guitarist

Twin towns

, Vaasa has town twinning treaties or treaties of cooperation signed with the following ten cities:

Godfather TownTwin TownCooperation TreatySister City

See also

Wasa, British Columbia (named after Vasa)
Blue Highway (an international tourist route)
Seinäjoki (a neighboring city from the South Ostrobothnia region)

Notes

Bibliography
 Julkunen, Mikko: Vaasa - Vasa. Vaasa: Vaasa, 1982.  (Photo book with English text.)

References

External links 

Vaasa – Official website 
Vaasa – Official website 
Vasa – Official website 
Tourist's Vaasa 

 
Cities and towns in Finland
Populated coastal places in Finland
Grand Duchy of Finland
Populated places established in 1606
Former capitals of Finland
1606 establishments in Sweden
Port cities and towns in Finland